This is a list of fictional humanoid species in literature, and is subsidiary to the lists of humanoids. It is a collection of various notable humanoid species that are featured in text literature, including novels, short stories, and poems, but not originating in comics or other sequential art.

References

Literature